Quand on n'a que l'amour is the second studio album by Jacques Brel. Also known as Jacques Brel 2, the original album was released in April 1957 by Philips (N76.085R). The album was reissued on 23 September 2003 under the title Quand on n'a que l'amour as part of the 16-CD box set Boîte à Bonbons by Barclay (980 816-4). The title song "Quand on a que l'amour" has been covered by Dalida, Céline Dion, Lara Fabian, Patricia Kaas, and Latifa, among others.

Track listing 

 Tracks 1–10 constituted the original 1957 album, recorded at the Théâtre de l'Apollo, Paris. 
 Track 11 was added when it was reissued as part of the 16-CD box set Boîte à Bonbons.

Credits 

 Jacques Brel – composer, vocals
 André Popp – orchestra conductor 
 Michel Legrand – orchestra conductor 
 François Rauber – orchestra conductor 
 A. Vénéroni – artwork

Certifications

References 

Jacques Brel albums
1957 albums
Philips Records albums
Barclay (record label) albums
French-language albums
Albums conducted by François Rauber
Albums conducted by Michel Legrand
Albums conducted by André Popp